Junior Mandrake is a 1997 Indian Malayalam-language comedy film directed by Ramasimhan aka Ali Akbar and written by Benny P. Nayarambalam from a story by Arun Kudamaloor. The plot revolves around the carriers of a mysterious bust named Junior Mandrake,  which is believed to bring misfortune to those who possess it. The film stars Jagadish, Jagathy Sreekumar, Rajan P. Dev and Janardhanan. The music was provided by the Berny-Ignatius duo. The bust in the movie eventually developed into a cult and is often referred during several situations in the life of a Malayali. In 2010, a sequel titled Senior Mandrake was released.

Plot 

Nambiar is a building contractor, an atheist. However, he is plagued by many a problem in his contracting business, particularly due to the conspiracies plotted by his competitor, Shankara Pillai. Compelled by his wife Sudharma, who is devoted to God, and his sons, Pradeep and Sandeep, Nambiar consents to consult an astrologer Thanku Panicker to find if there is any supernatural cause behind their problems. Panicker ascertains that there is an evil spirit residing in the bust of Junior Mandrake kept in their house.

Actually, Nambiar had been entrusted to handover this bust to someone in the airport when he returned from Singapore, but no one had showed up to receive it. Panicker prescribes the evil spirit can be got rid of only by presenting the bust to someone who may receive it "with pleasure", who in turn will be taken over by the evil spirit. Nambiar manages to present this bust to his adversary, Pillai, on his birthday party. Panicker is apparently proven right as the misfortune of Nambiar is now shifted to Pillai, starting with coconut falling on Pillai's new car, breaking its window, and also turning Nambiar into an ardent believer in God in the process.

Pillai soon learns about this and tries to get rid of the bust by several ways and finally manages to gift it to "Patti" Menon, the father-in-law of Nambiar. The bust makes various journeys back and forth, finally ending up with Omanakuttan, driver of Menon. Omanakuttan accidentally discovers that there is a bundle of precious stones hidden inside the bust. He takes some stones with him, and keeps the rest over the roof of his rented house.

By the time he came back as a wealthy man the house had been rented out by the owner as a police station. Omanakuttan tries to retrieve the remaining treasure from the roof by various means, several of these failed attempts prompts the police to believe that Omanakuttan is insane, he is forcefully confined in a mental hospital. During his time at the hospital, there is a series of jokers. At the same time, the actual owner of the bust, Junior Mandrake, a crime boss in whose shape the bust was made, who was so far in jail in Singapore, is now out searching for it.

Mandrake tracks down all those involved with the bust—Pillai, Nambiar, Pradeep, Sandeep, Menon, and Omanakuttan. He plants a bomb on a moving school van as a decoy to keep the police station with less cops, but Pradeep manages to detach the bomb and saves the children. Mandrake ends up in police custody in his attempt to recover the treasure from the police station, and the treasure goes to the government. The story ends with Pradeep joined with the daughter of Pillai with whom he was in love.

Cast 

 Jagadish as Pradeep Nambiar
 Jagathy Sreekumar as Driver Omanakuttan
 Rajan P. Dev as Nambiar, Pradeep's father 
 Janardhanan as Shankaran Pillai
 Kalabhavan Navas as Sandeep Nambiar, Pradeep's younger brother 
 Sidharaj as Junior Mandrake
 Keerthi Gopinath as Priya, Pillai's daughter
 Reena as  Sudharma, Nambiar's wife
 Paravoor Bharathan as 'Patti' Menon, Sudharma's father
 M. S. Thripunithura as Thanku Panicker
 Cochin Haneefa as Police Inspector
 Mala Aravindan as Maniyan Vaidhyan
 Indrans as Driver Gopalan
 Mamukkoya as Constable Abu
 Kalabhavan Rahman as Vakkachan
 Zeenath as Vishalakshi/Vishalam, Pillai's wife
 Kalpana as Vandana, Omanakuttan's wife
Sreeni Njarakkal as Nambiar's Manager
 Sagar Shiyas as Mental patient / American President

Production
Some of the scenes were improvised while filming, particularly that of Jagathy Sreekumar's.

Soundtrack

The film consists of three songs composed by the Berny–Ignatius duo, penned by O. N. V. Kurup and Ali Akbar. The original background score was also done by them. In the film, the character of Pradeep Nambiar (Jagadish) is a folk musician. So, the song "Ellarum Pokumcho" is written in the style of folk music.

Sequel
In 2010, a sequel titled Senior Mandrake was released, directed by Ali Akbar himself.

References

External links 
 

1997 films
1990s Malayalam-language films
Mandrake1
Films scored by Berny–Ignatius